Roger Lawrence Bisby (born 16 November 1952) is an English television presenter, journalist and plumber, known for his YouTube channel  Skill Builder and his expertise in the British building industry. He was the building expert on the long-running British consumer affairs television series Watchdog and then later Rogue Traders, both for the BBC.

Biography
Born in the City of London, one of six children to opera singer Charles Yates Bisby and his wife Jean Hazel Bisby, Bisby initially entered the building industry as an apprentice plumber. He went on to train as a college lecturer, and has also run his own building company for nearly 30 years.

Media career
In the last 30 years, Bisby has had a media career in many different areas. He has written articles and reviews for magazines and newspapers, had a series of DIY books published, appeared in television programmes, hosted radio shows, and more recently he has written a blog and started podcasting.

Publishing
Bisby entered journalism after sending an unsolicited article to a local paper as a PR exercise for his building company. Bisby worked on several building trade publications for Hamerville Publishing including Professional Builder magazine (for which he has been Products Editor for 16 years), Professional Electrician, Professional Heating and Plumbing Installer, and Professional Housebuilder and Property Developer. He has now left the print medium to concentrate on video production.

Published books include:

 Marshall Cavendish DIY guides
 Reader's Digest DIY Encyclopaedia
 Fix It DIY
 Here’s How
 The Knack
 Plumbing and Central Heating, Hamlyn Practical DIY Guides
 B&Q Best Way To Do It series

Radio
Bisby was the expert on LBC's Fix It Phone In which remained one of their most popular shows throughout its 15 years of broadcast. Bisby has also made guest appearances on talkSPORT, local BBC Radio and Capital FM.Radio 4 and Radio 2

Television
His television work includes appearances as the resident expert on The Terrace (BBC), Watchdog (BBC), Rogue Traders (BBC) and Dirty Tricks of the Tradesmen (BBC).

Television appearances:

 This Morning with Richard and Judy (ITV) - DIY Phone In
 Good Morning with Anne and Nick (ITV) - DIY projects
 Granada Television - DIY programmes
 Watchdog (BBC) - resident building expert
 Rogue Traders (BBC) - resident plumbing and heating expert
 House of Horrors (ITV) - resident building expert
 The Terrace (BBC) - resident building expert
 BBC News - building industry pundit
 Sky News - plumbing and heating expert
 Dirty Tricks of the Tradesmen (BBC) - acting rogue tradesman

Corporate
Since 1992, Bisby has been involved in the production of corporate media as a writer, voiceover artist, presenter, advisor and producer.
Corporate work:

 Worcester Bosch Group - Energy House, Boiler Installation Guides and Guide to Energy Efficiency
 Wedi - Tile Backer and Fundo
 Stanley Tools - Range Overview
 Jeyes - Cleaning up in the Garden
 Marshalls Paving - Range Guide
 Alpha Tape - Alfa Tape Live Demonstration
 Titan - Installing the Ecosafe
 NuHeat Underfloor Heating - Installation Guide
 DeWalt Powertools - Range Overview
 Bosch Power tools - Getting the Job Done

Internet
More recently, Bisby has moved into New Media with his Self Build and DIY website and YouTube Channel Skill Builder, which he co-developed with Colchester-based production company Motion.

Personal life
Bisby enjoys cycling (at the age of 13 he cycled around Britain), travel, running and rock climbing. He also gets involved in environmental clean-ups.

References

External links

www.skill-builder.uk - Skill Builder website
youtube.com/skillbuilderchannel - Skill Builder YouTube channel
www.switchonmk.com - Switch on to MK Podcast

English television presenters
English male journalists
English radio presenters
People from Reigate
1952 births
Living people